Euzopherodes nipponensis is a species of snout moth in the genus Euzopherodes. It was described by Hiroshi Yamanaka in 2006 and is known from Japan.

References

Moths described in 2006
Endemic fauna of Japan
Phycitini
Moths of Japan